Four regiments of the British Army have been numbered the 105th Regiment of Foot:

105th Regiment of Foot (Queen's Own Royal Regiment of Highlanders), raised in 1760, disbanded 1763.
105th Regiment of Foot, loyalist regiment raised in America and placed on the British establishment as the 105th Foot in 1782. Disbanded 1784.
105th Regiment of Foot (1794), raised in 1794 and disbanded in 1795.
105th Regiment of Foot (Madras Light Infantry), raised by the East India Company and placed on the British establishment as the 105th Foot in 1862.